Xyonysius basalis is a species of seed bug in the family Lygaeidae. It is found in the Caribbean, Central America, North America, and South America.

References

Further reading

 

Lygaeidae
Articles created by Qbugbot
Insects described in 1852